The Crooked River is a  tributary of the Songo River in Maine.  It is the longest of the tributaries of Sebago Lake, the outlet of which is the Presumpscot River, flowing to Casco Bay on the Atlantic Ocean.

The Crooked River rises at the outlet of Songo Pond in the unorganized territory of South Oxford in Oxford County, near the eastern end of the White Mountain National Forest.

See also
List of rivers of Maine

References

Maine Streamflow Data from the USGS
Maine Watershed Data From Environmental Protection Agency

Rivers of Oxford County, Maine
Rivers of Cumberland County, Maine
Harrison, Maine
Naples, Maine
Casco, Maine
Norway, Maine
Rivers of Maine